Benjamin Church may refer to:

 Benjamin Church (physician) (1734–1778), effectively the first Surgeon General of the U.S. Army
 Benjamin Church (ranger) (1639–1718), considered the father of the U.S. Army Rangers
 Benjamin Church (carpenter) (1807–1887), pioneer carpenter and builder in Milwaukee, Wisconsin